Mirsaid Mirshakar or Mirsaid Mirshakarov (born 6 May 1912 – died 1993) was a Soviet administrator, author, playwright and poet.

Life and career
Mirsaid Mirshakar was the son of a farmer, born in the village of Sindev, Pamir, Russian Empire, now Gorno-Badakhshan Autonomous Province, Tajikistan. He graduated from the Central Soviet Party School in Dushanbe in 1930, and his works began to appear in print the same year. He became a member of the Communist Party of the Soviet Union in 1944 and was the People's Poet of the Tajik Soviet Socialist Republic in 1962.

From 1932 to 33, Mirshakar served as the editor of the newspaper Sokhtmoni Vakhsh. He wrote narrative poems glorifying historic events in the life of the Tajik people after the 1917 October Revolution. Mirshakar was considered one of the founders of Tajik children's literature. His writings for children were the subject of the doctoral thesis of literary critic Jonon Bobokalonova.

Mirshakar served as the executive secretary of the Writers’ Union in Tadzhik from 1940 to 1943 and from 1946 to 1959. He also served in a number of administrative positions, including Chairman of the Supreme Soviet of the Tajik SSR. For his service as a poet, Mirshakar was awarded several state prizes for his works.

Honors and awards
Order of Lenin 
Order of Red Banner of Labor 
Order of the Badge of Honour 
Order of the October Revolution 
Stalin Prize winner 
Winner of the USSR State Prize

Works
Selected works include: 
The Golden Kishlak, 1942, State Prize of the USSR, 1950
She’rho va poëmaho, Dushanbe, 1945
The Turbulent Piandzh, 1949, State Prize of the USSR, 1950
She’rho va dostonho, Dushanbe, 1954
Lenin in the Pamirs, 1955
Kulliyot, parts 1–3, Dushanbe, 1970–73
Stikhotvoreniia i poemy, Moscow, 1951
Love and Duty, 1962
Lenin’s Gaze, 1962
Liubov’ i dolg. Poemy, Moscow, 1964
Polovod’ia zhizni, Moscow, 1972

Plays
Tashbek and Gul’kubran, 1946 
The Golden Kishlak, 1949 
My City, 1951

References

Soviet poets
Soviet dramatists and playwrights
Male dramatists and playwrights
Soviet male writers
1912 births
1993 deaths
People from Gorno-Badakhshan Autonomous Region
Recipients of the Order of Lenin
Recipients of the Order of Friendship of Peoples
Stalin Prize winners
Tajik poets
Male poets
Tajikistani children's writers